Anne Tingelstad Wøien is a Norwegian politician from Oppland representing the Centre Party. She was nominated in first place by her party in the 2009 Norwegian parliamentary elections and was elected to a four-year term in the Storting (2009-2013). She sits on the Standing Committee on Education, Research and Church Affairs.

Wøien was leader of Centre Youth's chapter in Oppland between 1990 and 1991. She was a member of the Gran municipality council and the group leader of her party from 1995 to 2003, and member of the Oppland county council from 2003 to 2005. She was political advisor to the oil and energy minister Odd Roger Enoksen between 2005 and 2007, then to the transportation and communications minister Liv Signe Navarsete between 2007 and 2009. She was a member of the Centre Party's central board between 2003 and 2009.

Wøien is the daughter of Marit Tingelstad who was a Storting representative between 1993 and 2001, and Hans Tingelstad who was a farmer.

References

Living people
1965 births
Centre Party (Norway) politicians
Members of the Storting
People from Oppland
21st-century Norwegian politicians